Carpenter Hill is a hill located in the eastern Sacramento Valley-Sierra Nevada foothills region of California. Despite its low elevation, the hill is the county highpoint of Sacramento County and thus the summit offers expansive views of the Central Valley.

Several antennas and towers stand on Carpenter Hill's grassy summit. The low elevation of the hill means snow rarely falls on its summit.

References

See also
List of highest points in California by county

Hills of California
Landforms of Sacramento County, California
Folsom, California
Geography of the Sacramento Valley